Grevillea myosodes is a species of flowering plant in the family Proteaceae and is endemic to north-western Australia. It is a spreading shrub with elliptic leaves and branched clusters of cream-coloured flowers.

Description

Taxonomy
Grevillea myosodes was first formally described in 1986 by Donald McGillivray in his book New Names in Grevillea (Proteaceae) from specimens collected by Michael Lazarides in 1959. The specific epithet (myosodes) means "mouse odour" referring to the scent of the flowers.

Distribution and habitat
This grevillea grows in woodland or sharubland in the east Kimberley region of Western Australia and in the Top End of the Northern Territory.

Conservation status
Grevillea myosodes is listed as "not threatened" by the Western Australian Government Department of Biodiversity, Conservation and Attractions, but as "near threatened" under the Northern Territory Government Territory Parks and Wildlife Conservation Act.

See also
 List of Grevillea species

References

myosodes
Proteales of Australia
Eudicots of Western Australia
Flora of the Northern Territory
Taxa named by Donald McGillivray
Plants described in 1986